The men's road race at the 1962 British Empire and Commonwealth Games, was part of the cycling programme, which took place in 1962.

Results

References

Men's road race
Road cycling at the Commonwealth Games